Chacapalpa District is one of ten districts of the province Yauli in Peru.

See also 
 Waqraqucha

References